Disphyma papillatum, commonly known as Chatham Island ice plant, is a species of flowering plant in the family Aizoaceae and is endemic to the Chatham Islands of New Zealand. It is a succulent, prostrate herb with flattened, pimply, trailing stems, leaves that are triangular in cross-section, and white to pink, dark blue or purple daisy-like flowers.

Description
There are many stamens with yellow anthers and five or six styles. Flowering occurs from November to January and the fruit is a capsule  in diameter before opening. It is similar to Disphyma crassifolium but is distinguished from that species by its pimply, rather than smooth, and flattened, two-angled rather than cylindrical stems.

Taxonomy
Disphyma papillatum was first formally described in 1971 by Robert Chinnock in the New Zealand Journal of Botany.

Distribution and habitat
Carpobrotus glaucescens is endemic to the Chatham Islands, including the main island, Rangiuaria, Rangatira, Mangere Island, Little Mangere Island, Moturoa and Castle Island.

References

Aizoaceae
Flora of New Zealand
Taxa named by Robert Chinnock
Plants described in 1971